Humberto Scovino (born 20 December 1942) is a Venezuelan footballer. He played in four matches for the Venezuela national football team in 1967. He was also part of Venezuela's squad for the 1967 South American Championship.

References

1942 births
Living people
Venezuelan footballers
Venezuela international footballers
Place of birth missing (living people)
Association football forwards